The Big Bicycle is a large sculpture in Chullora, New South Wales and is one the many big things of Australia.

Design
In 1997, built by Phillip Becker, John Ridley, and Andy Lugiz, the Big Bicycle sits outside of the entrance to the Chullora Waste Transfer Station in Chullora, New South Wales, Australia and is made fully out of recycling material.

References

Bicycles in art
Big things in New South Wales
City of Canterbury-Bankstown
Individual vehicles
Cycling in Sydney